Dr. Sin II is the fifth studio album by Brazilian hard rock band Dr. Sin, released in 2000. The power trio becomes now a quartet with Michael Vescera (ex- Obsession, MVP, Loudness and Yngwie Malmsteen) on the lead vocals.

Track listing

American and European version - Shadows of Light

In Europe and the United States, the album was released in 2002 under the title of Shadows of Light. The differences were in the titles and the order of the songs.

Track listing

Personnel 
 Michael Vescera - (Lead Vocals/Keyboards)
 Andria Busic – (Bass/Backing Vocals)
 Ivan Busic – (Drums/Backing Vocals)
 Eduardo Ardanuy – (Guitars)
 Joey Gross Brown - (Keyboards)

Special guests 
 Serj Buss -  on the track Same old Story
 Roland Grapow on the tack Time After Time (2nd guitar)
 Jason Himmelberger - Keyboards on the tracks Time After Time, What Now, Fly Away and Inside the Pain

References

Dr. Sin albums
2000 albums
2002 albums